Jeff Arnold may refer to:
 Jeff Arnold (politician) (born 1967), American politician
 Jeff Arnold (Internet entrepreneur), American entrepreneur

See also
 Geoff Arnold (born 1944), English cricketer